Upwards Stars is a semi-professional club soccer team in Spartanburg, South Carolina.  They started playing in the National Premier Soccer League.

Players

Coaching Staff
  Paul Henson - Head Coach
  Camilo Rodriguez - Assistant Coach
  Mitch McKay - Goalkeepers Coach

References

External links
 Official site

National Premier Soccer League teams
Soccer clubs in South Carolina